Jane Wenham (died 1730) was one of the last people to be condemned to death for witchcraft in England, although her conviction was set aside. Her trial in 1712 is commonly but erroneously regarded as the last witch trial in England.

Background
Wenham, a widow of Walkern, Hertfordshire, brought a charge of defamation against a farmer, in response to an accusation of witchcraft. The local justice of the peace, Sir Henry Chauncy referred the matter to the Rev Gardiner, the rector of Walkern. She was awarded with a shilling, though advised to be less quarrelsome. She was disappointed with this outcome, and it was reported that she had said she would have justice "some other way". She supposedly then bewitched Ann Thorne, a servant at the rectory.

Trial
A warrant for Wenham's arrest was issued by Sir Henry Chauncy, who gave instructions that she be searched for "witch marks". She requested that she undergo trials to avoid being detained, such as a swimming test, however, she was asked to repeat the Lord's Prayer.

The accused was brought before Sir John Powell at the assize court at Hertford on 4 March 1712. A number of villagers gave evidence that Wenham practised witchcraft. The judge was clearly more sceptical than the jury of the evidence presented. When an accusation of flying was made, the judge remarked that flying, per se, was not a crime.

Some historians such as Keith Thomas have suggested, taking this case is an example, that there was generally a difference in attitudes towards supposed witchcraft between educated and less educated people, the latter being more credulous. However, the Wenham case is arguably more complicated than this distinction might imply, as Henry Chauncy, for example, was a published author who had studied at Cambridge University. Chauncy's motivation has been the subject of speculation. Ian Bostridge, one of Keith Thomas' students, has argued that political issues were involved in the case.

Final years

Wenham was removed from her village for her own safety.

In her final years, she was visited by Bishop Francis Hutchinson (1660–1739), author of an Historical essay concerning witchcraft (1718) in which he applied an extremely rational approach to the subject. Hutchinson, who had met other survivors of witch-hunts, regarded their persecution as Tory superstition.

Other cases
According to the Oxford Dictionary of National Biography, Jane Wenham was the last person convicted of witchcraft in England.

However, trials and executions for witchcraft continued in England after the Wenham case. One such case involved Mary Hickes and her nine-year-old daughter Elizabeth, who were condemned to death by the assize court and were hanged in Huntingdon on Saturday 28 July 1716.

Contemporary accounts
The trial caused a sensation in London, where publishers such as Edmund Curll sold material proclaiming Wenham's innocence or guilt.  
One of the witnesses at the trial, Francis Bragge, published three pamphlets about the case including, A full and impartial account of the discovery of sorcery and witchcraft practis'd by Jane Wenham of Walkerne in Hertfordshire.

Plays

The Last Witch
In 2012, a play entitled The Last Witch was performed at Hertford Theatre and Walkern Hall, 300 years after the original trial. Written by Kate Miller and directed by former Hertfordshire vicar Richard Syms, the play starred Toni Brooks as the titular character, with Rhiannon Drake as Anne Thorne and Lindsay Cooper as Debora Gardiner.

Jane Wenham: The Witch of Walkern
In 2015 a play about Wenham by Rebecca Lenkiewicz opened at Watford Palace Theatre and went on tour.

References

Further reading
 Alan Akeroyd and Caroline Clifford, Huntingdon: Eight Centuries of History (2004)

External links

 Articles on Jane Wenham on the Walkern History Society website 

1730 deaths
People from Hertfordshire
Burials in Hertfordshire
Witch trials in England
Year of birth unknown